Lindsay Fields (born May 30, 1986), known professionally as Jade Novah, is an American singer and songwriter. She rose to prominence for her YouTube videos covering songs such as "Diamonds" by Rihanna. Novah's debut album, All Blue, was nominated for a 2019 NAACP Image Award in the Best New Artist category.

Career 
Novah was raised in Cleveland, Ohio and grew up singing in church. At 21, she moved to Atlanta and began songwriting for artists such as Myá, Melanie Fiona and Christina Milian. In 2012, she pursued a solo singing career. Novah has performed as a backup singer for artists such as Beyoncé, Lady Gaga, and Rihanna.

Novah first gained prominence for her YouTube cover videos. A cover of "Diamonds" by Rihanna received 11 million views as of 2013. She released her first single in August 2013, "Show Out". An album called In Search Of Me was announced in November 2013, but was never released. It was produced by her husband, Devin Johnson.

On July 13, 2018, she released her debut album, "All Blue". For the album, she was nominated for a 2019 NAACP Image Award as Best New Artist. She appeared on FOX's The Four: Battle for Stardom as a vocal producer and mentor, as well as co-hosted The Morning Culture Show on V-103 in Atlanta. "I Just Wanna Know" is the introduction into Jade's forthcoming concept album set to release in 2022. Following the success of "I Just Wanna Know" Jade released "Lost in You", the second single of her upcoming project.

Other work
In 2018, Novah also went viral for her comedic parody YouTube video where she portrayed Beyoncé, Toni Braxton, and others. That year she was also a music mentor for contestants on The Four. She began working as a VJ for V-103's morning show in January 2019 and left after nine months to focus on her career. Novah has appeared on the TV show That's My Jam on NBC.

Personal life 
Novah is married to Devin Johnson, her producer and music manager.

Discography

Studio albums
 All Blue (2018)
 Stages (2020)

References

External links 
Official website
Jade Novah on AllMusic

Living people
21st-century American women singers
American women songwriters
African-American women singer-songwriters
Singer-songwriters from Ohio
People from Cleveland
Entertainers from Ohio
21st-century African-American women singers
1986 births
21st-century American singers
20th-century African-American people
20th-century African-American women